Francis Seymour, 5th Duke of Somerset (17 January 165820 April 1678), known as 3rd Baron Seymour of Trowbridge between 1665 and 1675, was an English peer.

He was the son of Charles Seymour, 2nd Baron Seymour of Trowbridge, and Elizabeth Alington (1635–1692). The dukedom came to him because his grandfather, Sir Francis Seymour, was a younger brother of the 2nd Duke of Somerset. He died aged 20, unmarried and childless, having been shot dead by Horatio Botti (a Genoese gentleman), whose wife Seymour was said to have insulted at Lerici. He was succeeded by his brother Charles Seymour.

References

1658 births
1678 deaths
505
Deaths by firearm in Italy
F
Baron Seymour of Trowbridge